Canada Glacier is a small glacier flowing south-east into the northern side of Taylor Valley in Victoria Land, Antarctica.  It is in the Ross Dependency. Its melting season is in the summer.

Description
The glacier receives less than 10 cm of snowfall annually, and is (technically) an  ecosystem.  Its seasonal melting feeds Lake Hoare to the west and Lake Fryxell to the east. At the north side of its head sit the Hothem Cliffs.

History
The glacier was discovered and named in the course of the Terra Nova Expedition (1910–1913), under Robert Scott.  Charles S. Wright, a Canadian physicist, was a member of the party that explored the area.

Antarctic Specially Protected Area
An area of about 1 km2 on the eastern side of the glacier is protected under the Antarctic Treaty System as Antarctic Specially Protected Area (ASPA) No.131 because it contains some of the richest plant growth (bryophytes and algae) in the McMurdo Dry Valleys region.  It is exceptionally important not only for its ecological and biological values, but also as a reference site for other similar ecosystems.  The site comprises sloping ice-free ground with summer ponds and meltwater streams.  It is unusual in receiving more consistent water flows than many other parts of the Dry Valleys region, and is sheltered from strong winds by the 20 m high glacier face.

See also
 Canada Peak
 List of glaciers in the Antarctic
 Glaciology

Further reading 
 Cherry-Garrard, A. (1922, 2001 reprint). The Worst Journey in the World. Stackpole Books. 
 Fiennes, R. Race to the Pole : Tragedy, Heroism, and Scott's Antarctic Quest. Hyperion. 
 Hattersley-Smith, G. (1984). The Norwegian with Scott: The Antarctic Diary of Tryggve Gran, 1910-13. Stationery Office. 
 Jones, M. (2003). The Last Great Quest : Captain Scott's Antarctic Sacrifice. Oxford University Press, USA. 
 Lambert, K. (2004). The Longest Winter: The Incredible Survival of Captain Scott's Lost Party. Smithsonian Books. 
 Scott, R. et al. (1996). Scott's Last Expedition: The Journals. Carroll & Graf Publishers. 
 Solomon, S. (2002). The Coldest March: Scott's Fatal Antarctic Expedition. Yale University Press. 
 Ponting, H. G. (1921). The Great White South. Cooper Square Press.

References

Antarctic Specially Protected Areas
Glaciers of McMurdo Dry Valleys